George Story may refer to:

 George Story (politician) (1849–1931), member of the Queensland Legislative Assembly
 George Story (priest) (1664–1721), English clergyman

See also
 George Storey, rugby league footballer of the 1940s and 1950s
 George Adolphus Storey (1834–1919), English painter and illustrator